Trenton is the name of some places in the U.S. state of Wisconsin:
Trenton, Dodge County, Wisconsin, a town
Trenton, Pierce County, Wisconsin, a town
Trenton (community), Wisconsin, an unincorporated community
Trenton, Washington County, Wisconsin, a town